Emmanuel Yarbrough (September 5, 1964 – December 21, 2015) was an American martial artist, professional wrestler, football player and actor. He was particularly known for his career in amateur sumo, and held the Guinness World Record for the heaviest living athlete.

Background
Yarbrough started his sports career at Morgan State University, where he became an offensive tackle for the college football team before joining the college wrestling team. He was given the ironic nickname "Tiny" due to his large size. He achieved NCAA All-American Division II wrestler status in 1983 and 1985, the university later ascending to Division I in 1986, while in football he was a Division I athlete in 1982 and 1983. After college, Yarbrough trained in judo under Yoshisada Yonezuka, who coached him to a silver medal victory at the US Nationals tournament at brown belt level. This experience would lead him to take a further interest in martial arts, exploring amateur sumo and mixed martial arts.

Amateur sumo career
Yarbrough started competing in amateur sumo in 1992. He won silver medals in the Sumo World Championships in 1992 and 1994, as well as a bronze medal in 1993. Two years later, after his appearance in Ultimate Fighting Championship, Yarbrough increased his previous weight by 282 lbs. Eventually, Yarbrough reached 704 lbs, which gave him the Guinness World Record for the heaviest living athlete. He quickly became the World Amateur Sumo Champion, leading him to be one of the most famous sumo wrestlers outside Japan.

In 2007, he intended to drop from 750 to 550 lbs in order to improve his health, still hoping to participate in the next Sumo World Championships and the US Olympic judo tryouts.

Mixed martial arts career
In 1994, Yarbrough applied to mixed martial arts promotion Ultimate Fighting Championship and took part in the event UFC 3 representing sumo. He was pitted against the much smaller Keith Hackney, a kempo representative, who opened the match by immediately knocking Yarborough down with a palm strike. Emmanuel recovered, pulled Hackney towards his chest and unloaded strikes on his neck, and then literally pushed him out the cage through the door in spectacular fashion. However, when the match was restarted, Hackney knocked Yarbrough again and followed with hand strikes for the TKO. Keith since took the nickname "The Giant Killer" for this victory.

Emmanuel's second MMA fight would be in Japan for the promotion Shooto. He faced Tatsuo Nakano, a former shoot-style professional wrestler whom Yarbrough outsized greatly. This time, the sumo wrestler got advantage of fighting in a ring and cornered Nakano against the turnbuckle, taking dominant position over him. When the contenders were relocated on the center of the ring, Yarbrough just shifted his abdomen over Nakano's head. Unable to get out from under his opponent and being smothered by the weight, the Japanese fighter tapped out, giving Yarbrough his first and only victory.

Only months later, Emmanuel fought his third and last bout, for the Japanese promotion Pride Fighting Championships, facing his smallest opponent in the form of Japanese grappler Daiju Takase. Takase avoided engaging Yarbrough and earned a yellow card for inactivity in the second round. Eventually, Takase attempted a takedown, which Yarbrough was able to deny and gain dominant position; however, Takase managed to escape and landed numerous punches to Yarbrough’s head and body, forcing him to submit.

Professional wrestling career
From 1996 to 1997, Yarbrough competed in professional wrestling for Catch Wrestling Association in Germany, where he had gimmick matches based around his sumo career. He took part in a sumo tournament against the entire staff of the promotion, being declared winner after beating everybody except August Smisl and Terminator Mastino. He later won another tournament, beating the likes of Osamu Nishimura and Jason Neidhart, Jim Neidhart's storyline cousin.

Acting
He appeared in a 1997 Bollywood film Mr. and Mrs. Khiladi which features Bollywood action hero Akshay Kumar and has appeared on several talk shows, as well as in a commercial for Motorola. He has also appeared on the HBO drama Oz as an inmate named Clarence Seroy. In 2000, he played himself in the German wrestling film Sumo Bruno.

Death
On December 21, 2015, Yarbrough died at the age of 51, from a heart attack. His manager said that he had battled all his life with food addiction and "he always said, 'I am a prisoner in my own body.'" By the age of 14 he already weighed 320 pounds, which he attributed to a poor diet of fried foods. In 2007, he was hospitalized for a week due to heart failure, and after seeing an obesity specialist and changing his diet he reduced his weight from over 800 to around 670 pounds.

Mixed martial arts record

|-
| Loss
|align=center| 1–2
| Daiju Takase
| TKO (submission to punches)
| Pride 3
| 
|align=center| 2
|align=center| 3:22
| Tokyo, Japan
| 
|-
| Win
|align=center| 1–1
| Tatsuo Nakano
| Submission (smother)
| Shooto - Shoot the Shooto XX
| 
|align=center| 1
|align=center| 1:17
| Yokohama, Japan
|
|-
| Loss
|align=center| 0–1
| Keith Hackney
| TKO (punches)
| UFC 3
| 
|align=center| 1
|align=center| 1:59
| Charlotte, North Carolina, United States
|

Championships and accomplishments

Sumo 
1995 World Amateur Sumo Champion
1992 1st Sumo World Championships Open Division 2nd Place
1993 2nd Sumo World Championships Open Division 3rd Place
1994 3rd Sumo World Championships Open Division 2nd Place
1996 5th Sumo World Championships Open Division 2nd Place

Collegiate wrestling 
NCAA All American, 1983, 1985 and 1986, Morgan State University

Judo 
Second place, U.S. Nationals 1989

College football
NCAA Division I-AA All-American offensive tackle, Morgan State University, 1982, 1983

References

External links
 Amateur Sumo Profile
 
 

1964 births
2015 deaths
American male mixed martial artists
American male professional wrestlers
American sumo wrestlers
American male judoka
African-American mixed martial artists
Mixed martial artists utilizing judo
Mixed martial artists utilizing collegiate wrestling
Mixed martial artists utilizing Sumo
American male sport wrestlers
Amateur wrestlers
African-American players of American football
Heavyweight mixed martial artists
Sportspeople from Rahway, New Jersey
Ultimate Fighting Championship male fighters
20th-century African-American sportspeople
21st-century African-American people